Manel Torres is a Spanish fashion designer, and inventor of the spray-on fabric Fabrican. Torres was born in Barcelona; he moved to London where he obtained a Masters in Womenswear Design from the Royal College of Art.  Torres then moved to India where he worked in the fashion industry before returning to London to pursue his PhD at The Royal College of Art.

References 

20th-century Spanish people
21st-century Spanish people
Living people
Year of birth missing (living people)
Spanish fashion designers
Alumni of the Royal College of Art
People from Barcelona